Psammophis condanarus, the sand snake, is a species of snake found in dry low country zones of Indian peninsula (except the far south), Pakistan and Nepal. It is a fast-moving, diurnal, terrestrial species and lives in stony outcrops and boulders. It was first described from Ganjam area of Odisha State and then later on recorded from many parts of the Indian subcontinent.

Distribution
This species is found in Bangladesh, Cambodia, India (Andhra Pradesh, Bihar, Chhattisgarh, Delhi, Gujarat, Haryana, Jharkhand, Karnataka, Madhya Pradesh, Maharashtra, Odisha, Punjab, Rajasthan, Telangana, Uttrakhand, Uttar Pradesh, West Bengal and Tripura), Laos, Myanmar, Nepal, Pakistan, Thailand, and Viet Nam.

The subspecies indochinensis is found in Thailand, Myanmar (Burma), and Cambodia. This form is now treated as a full species.

Description
The rostral scales are as deep as broad, visible from above; nasal divided or semidivided; internasals rather more than half the length of the prefrontals; frontal very narrow, as long as or longer than its distance from the end of the snout, as long as the parietals; loreal about twice as long as deep; preocular single, not extending to the frontal; two postoculars; temporals 1+2 or 1+3, rarely 2+3; upper labials 8, fourth and fifth entering the eye; 4 lower labials in contact with the anterior chin-shields, which are as long as the posterior. Scales in 17 rows, ventrals 156–182; anal divided; subcaudals 75–90.

It is a pale olive-brown, with two pairs of more or less distinct dark bands each two scales wide j these bands, the lower of which passes through the eye, often black-edged; upper lip and lower parts uniform yellowish with a dark line along each side of the ventrals and subcaudals.

Notes

References
 Hughes, B. 1999 Critical review of a revision of Psammophis (Linnaeus 1758) (Erpentes, Reptilia) by Frank Brandstätter. Afr. J. Herpetol. 48 (1-2): 63-70
 Jerdon, T.C. 1865 Remarks on observations contained in Dr. Günther's work on the reptiles of British India. Ann. Mag. Nat. Hist. (3) 15: 416-418
 Merrem, B. 1820 Versuch eines Systems der Amphibien I (Tentamen Systematis Amphibiorum). J. C. Kriegeri, Marburg, 191 pp.
 Ganesh, S.R., V. Sharma & M.B. Guptha (2017). Records of the Indian Sand Snake Psammophis condanarus (Merrem, 1820) (Reptilia: Lamprophiidae) in southern India. Journal of Threatened Taxa 9(7): 10453–10458.

External links
 http://threatenedtaxa.org/index.php/JoTT/article/view/3468/4104

Psammophis
Fauna of Southeast Asia
Reptiles of Thailand
Reptiles described in 1820